Serbian Patriarchate may refer to:

 Serbian Patriarchate of Peć, medieval and early modern Serbian Patriarchate with seat in Patriarchal Monastery of Peć, from 1346 to 1766
 Serbian Patriarchate of Sremski Karlovci or Patriarchate of Karlovci, particular Serbian Patriarchate in Habsburg Monarchy with patriarchal seat in the city of Sremski Karlovci, from 1848 to 1920
 Serbian Orthodox Church (1920–present), modern Serbian Patriarchate with patriarchal seat in Belgrade, from 1920 to the present

Serbian Patriarchate may also colloquially refer to:
 Old Serbian Patriarchal Palace in Sremski Karlovci
 New Serbian Patriarchal Palace in Belgrade

See also
 Serbian Patriarch (disambiguation)
 Patriarchate of Peć (disambiguation)
 Serbian Archbishopric (disambiguation)